Unnai Thedi is a 1999 Indian Tamil-language romantic drama film directed by Sundar C. The film stars  Ajith Kumar and Malavika, while an ensemble supporting cast includes Karan, Vivek, Sivakumar, and Srividya. Some of the scenes are similar and adapted from the 1995 Hindi blockbuster movie Dilwale Dulhaniya Le Jayenge. The film's music is composed by Deva, the film released on 5 February 1999 to positive reviews from critics and it was declared hit at the box office.

Plot
Raghupathy, studying in Australia, goes to New Zealand with a friend and runs into Malavika. They start off having petty fights but end up falling in love. But circumstances force them to separate without exchanging any information about each other.

Back at home, Raghu makes friends with Prakash and chances upon his family photograph which surprisingly includes his mother Saradha, who as far as he knew had no relations. But on questioning, his mother reveals that she was part of a large family (three brothers and a sister) but had been sent out of the family after deciding to wed someone of her own choice. Raghu travels to the village as Prakash's friend and soon endears himself to the members of his family. Turns out Malavika is the daughter of one of the brothers too. But when he learns that Prakash wishes to marry her, he decides to bow out. But Prakash, on knowing about their romance, wishes that they get together.

The family elders too agree to Raghu marrying Malavika but refuse to let the alliance go any further after learning that Raghu is Saradha's son. Raghu too agrees to sacrifice his love since he does not want to wed Malavika and cause even more friction in the already fractured family. How Raghu eventually reunites the separated family and weds Malavika forms the crux of the film.

Cast

 Ajith Kumar as Raghupathi
 Malavika as Malavika
 Sivakumar as Adhi Narayanan
 Moulee as Sivaraman
 Srividya as Sharadha
 Vivek as Vivek
 Karan as Prakash
 Manorama as Aachi
 Swathi as Chitra
 Jai Ganesh as Shankaran
 Rajeev as Moorthy
 Sathyapriya as Rajalakshmi
 Vaiyapuri as Vaiyapuri
 Shanmugasundaram as Raghupathi
 Vinu Chakravarthy as Sandhanapandi
 Mahanadi Shankar as Muthupandi 
 Kaka Radhakrishnan as Valaiyapathi
 Madhan Bob as Ramakrishnan
 Singamuthu
 Nellai Siva
 Periya Karuppu Thevar as Periya Karuppu
 Halwa Vasu
 Khushbu in a cameo appearance

Production
The original plot point was recommended by Singampuli, one of Sundar C's assistant director and Sundar wrote the script of the film within a week, before discussing the line with actor Ajith Kumar. Ajith was initially unimpressed but agreed to do the love story anyway, mentioning that if the film became a success he would feature in a future film to be directed by Singampuli. Eventually the film became hit, and As promised by Ajith Kumar he did the film, Red with the director Singam Puli. This film began its shoot in late 1998 with scenes being canned in Australia and in Christchurch, New Zealand as well as India. The producers initially approached Laila to play the lead role, however she refused to commit to any other films until the release of her Kallazhagar. Subsequently, she was replaced by newcomer Shweta Konnur, who was given the stage name of Malavika by the director.

Release
The film received positive reviews from critics. In contrast, a critic from Tamil Star noted "the initial half where Ajith and Malavika meet, is very similar to Dilwale Dulhania Le Jayenge (1995). Sundar.C could have done a lot better than this".

The film was one of the hit films among several films that Ajith Kumar had featured in throughout 1999, while the chemistry between the lead pair prompted them to sign another film together, Anantha Poongatre. The film was later dubbed into Telugu as Premato Pilicha, while the movie was partly remade in Bengali as Bandhan.

Soundtrack

The soundtrack of the film was composed by Deva, was well received by the audience. Deva reused most of the background music from Annamalai without changing it in this film. Lyrics were written by Palani Bharathi, Kalaikumar, Ra. Ravishankar.

References

External links

1999 films
Films shot in Australia
Films shot in New Zealand
Films shot in Tamil Nadu
Indian drama films
Indian family films
1990s Tamil-language films
Films directed by Sundar C.
Films scored by Deva (composer)
Films set in Australia
Films set in New Zealand
1999 drama films